Pablo Javier Morant  (born June 30, 1970 in Esquel) is a retired Argentine footballer. He played for a number of clubs both in Argentina and Spain, including Club de Gimnasia y Esgrima La Plata, Colón de Santa Fe and Hércules CF.

After he retired from playing, Morant became a football coach. He worked with Gimnasia y Esgrima La Plata's youth team before managing the senior club on an interim basis in 2010. Morant coaches the youth side of Colón de Santa Fe.

References

External links
 Statistics at FutbolXXI.com  
 Statistics at LFP.es 

1970 births
Living people
People from Esquel
Argentine footballers
Argentine Primera División players
Club Atlético Colón footballers
Club de Gimnasia y Esgrima La Plata footballers
Hércules CF players
La Liga players
Expatriate footballers in Spain
Argentine expatriate sportspeople in Spain
Argentine football managers
Club de Gimnasia y Esgrima La Plata managers
Association football defenders